George Kenyon was a British architect, who worked as City Architect for the city of Newcastle upon Tyne. He designed the Newcastle Civic Centre in the 1950s, which was completed in 1967. It was given 'Grade II* listed' (the second-highest possible) designation in November 1995, making it legally protected from unauthorised alteration or demolition. Earlier in his career, Kenyon he was involved in the construction of the Empire State Building.

References

Year of birth missing
Year of death missing
Architects from Northumberland
People from Newcastle upon Tyne